Entebbe Military Hospital, also Katabi Military Hospital or Katabi UPDAF Hospital, but whose official name is Ronald Bata Memorial Hospital, is a military hospital in Uganda.

Location
The coordinates of the hospital are 0°05'01.0"N, 32°28'50.0"E (Latitude:0.083612; Longitude:32.480557).

Overview
The hospital caters to the units of the UPDF stationed in Entebbe, including the Air Force and Special Forces Command.

History
The hospital underwent renovations and an upgrade in 2017, at an estimated cost of USh293 million (approx. US$80,000). The upgrade, carried out by the UPDF Engineering brigade took about eighteen weeks. The hospital's name was officially re-branded to Ronald Bata Memorial Hospital, in memory of the late Dr. Ronald Bata, the first medical doctor to join the National Resistance Army guerrilla outfit in 1982, during Ugandan Bush War. Approximately 75 percent of the patients are civilians from the surrounding community.

See also
List of hospitals in Uganda

References

External links
 Government To Construct Shs100 Billion Military Hospital At Mbuya

Entebbe Military Hospital
Wakiso District
Entebbe